The Battle of Mandan was fought between the Shekhawat chiefs and the Mughal Empire due to their refusal to pay tribute to the emperor.The Mughals were Helped by Ahirs of Rewari under Mitra Sen Ahir and the Baloch chieftains Peero Khan and Kale Khan.

Battle
The Shekhawati Rajput chieftains had been beating back invasions in their area for a long time. In 1775 the Shekhawati chiefs refused to pay tribute to the Mughals which resulted in an invasion by the Mughal army under the command of Mitra Sen Ahir, Kale Khan and Peero Khan. A pitched battle was fought in which both sides suffered heavy losses. Peero Khan was killed and Mitra Sen fled, resulting in a victory for the Shekhawat chiefs.

Aftermath
Devi Singhs achievement in Mandan was acknowledged by the Maharaja of Jaipur. Mitrasen Ahir again helped the Mughals against the Shekhawats. This time against the Shekhawat chieftain of Kanud, on February 1779. The Rajput garrison numbered only 400 and their chieftain, Nawal Singh Shekhawat was severely ill, but still gave a long resistance and even managed to sally out and kill Mitrasen's men. However Nawal Singh Shekhawat eventually died from his illness due to which the Mughals were able to negotiate a  peace and exchange Kanud fort for other villages, which were given to Nawal Singhs widow. The Shekhawati chiefs faced another invasion in 1780, when the Mughal empire sent Murtaza Khan Bhadech to collect tax in Shekhawati. The two forces fought the bloody Battle of Khatu Shyamji on July 1779 where after heavy losses on both sides, Murtaza was killed.

References

Mandan
History of Rajasthan
Mandan
Mandan